Abuse of Power is a 1971 film starring Nikos Kourkoulos, Betty Livanou and Manos Katrakis.

Plot 
Nikos Kourkoulos plays Haridimos Tsiontis, a student who becomes a police detective and a member of the drug squad looking for the killers of his drug-addicted brother. His unconventional tactics get him into trouble with his superiors but they eventually relent and allow him to continue his investigation. The drug dealers discover his identity and force him to become a drug addict. In the end, Tsiontis  recovers from his drug addiction and manages to get the drug kingpin arrested. His superior officer congratulates him and offers him a permanent job as a member of the drug squad but Tsiontis refuses and returns to his studies.

Reception
Abuse of Power was the fourth most commercially successful film of 1971 in Greece.

Cast 
Nikos Kourkoulos ..... Charidimos Siontis / Stathis Theodorelos
Betty Livanou ..... Eleni Apostolopoulou
Manos Katrakis ..... Kanelos Vasilopoulos
Spyros Kalogirou ..... Vasilis Apostolopoulos
Giannis Argyris ..... boss
Nassos Kedrakas ..... pub owner
Andreas Filippidis ..... police chief
Spyros Konstantopoulos ..... Peresiadis
Dinos Karydis ..... Antonis

Release 
The film premiered in Greece on 23 March 1971.

References

External links

1970s crime thriller films
1971 films
Greek crime thriller films
Finos Film films